Borabu is a constituency in Kenya. It is one of the four constituencies in Nyamira County. It was established prior to the 2013 general elections. It was initially part of North Mugirango Constituency.

Wards
Borabu Constituency has four electoral wards, namely: Esise, Mekenene, Kiabonyoru and Nyansiongo.

Borabu Sub-county
Borabu Constituency shares common boundaries with Borabu Sub-county. The Sub-county is headed by the sub-county administrator, appointed by a County Public Service Board.

Members of Parliament

References 

Constituencies in Nyamira County